The Serenade in D major for Violin, Viola and Cello, Op. 8, is a string trio composition by Ludwig van Beethoven. It was written from 1796–97, and published in 1797 by Artaria in Vienna.

Structure

The composition is in six movements

 Marcia: Allegro (4/4) – Adagio (3/4)
 Menuetto: Allegretto (3/4)
 Adagio - Scherzo: Allegro molto - Adagio - Allegro molto - Adagio, in D minor (2/4)
 Allegretto alla polacca, in F major (3/4)
 Andante quasi allegretto (2/4) - Variation 1 - Variation 2 - Variation 3 - Variation 4 (2/4) - Allegro (6/8) - Tempo I  (2/4)
 Marcia: Allegro (4/4)

A typical performance takes around 26–30 minutes.

Transcriptions

In 1803, Franz Xaver Kleinheinz arranged this piece for viola and piano. It was published as the Notturno for Viola and Piano in D major, Op. 42, with Beethoven incorrectly credited as its author (although he did make corrections to Kleinheinz's work).

In his book Classic Music: Expression, Form, and Style, Leonard G. Ratner cites the fourth movement as a representative example of the polonaise.

References
Notes

Sources

External links 
 

String trios by Ludwig van Beethoven
Beethoven
1797 compositions
Compositions in D major